Caldicoprobacter guelmensis  is a Gram-positive, thermophilic, non-spore-forming, anaerobic, xylanolytic and non-motile bacterium from the genus of Caldicoprobacter which has been isolated from water from a hot spring from Guelma in Algeria.

References

 

Eubacteriales
Bacteria described in 2013
Thermophiles